The Operation National Sword was a policy initiative launched in 2017 by the Government of China to monitor and more stringently review recyclable waste imports. Before the policy, China was importing the vast majority of recyclables from North America and Europe for two decades. This practice of buying recyclables brought raw materials for the growing industrial capacity of China, but also brought a lot of contaminated recyclables which ended up accruing in China, causing other environmental concerns such as air and water pollution.

The action was interpreted as an international relations move by China against Western countries. The policy caused a ripple effect in the global recyclables market, causing major pile ups in Western countries who had been collecting lower quality recyclables in single-stream recycling, and displacing some of those recyclable to other countries, mostly in South East Asia, like Vietnam and Malaysia.

Background 

The Chinese Government implemented the Operation Green Fence in February 2013. This initiative antecedes the Operation National Sword, as it was already launched as an aggressive inspection effort aimed at reducing the amount of contaminated recyclables and waste that was being sent to the country.

Implementation 

In April 2017, Communist Party of China general secretary Xi Jinping in a speech during the 34th meeting of the Reform Enforcement Task Force emphasized the country's focus on environmental issues related to foreign "waste". China then notified the World Trade Organization (WTO) on 18 July 2017 that it intends to ban additional "solid waste" imports by year-end. This includes plastics waste, unsorted waste paper and waste textile materials. China also announced that the percentage of contaminants allowed in recycled materials would drop from 5–10% to 0.5%. In March 2018, the National Sword policy came into effect, banning the import of 24 categories of scrap materials, including low-grade plastics and unsorted mixed paper.

Impact 

After the implementation of the policy, a knock-on effect was caused on the amount of plastic accepted for import by Chinese re-processors. Immediately after the Chinese notification in July 2017, organizations such as the Institute of Scrap Recycling Industries and the Bureau of International Recycling warned that this action would cause job losses, shut down many recycling facilities and send more waste to landfills. The ONS encouraged the Western world to turn to nations like Malaysia, the Philippines, Cambodia, Thailand, and India, among other countries. However, by early 2019, many Southeast Asian countries also started to reject the waste as well. A 2018 study by Brooks et al. estimated that ONS could displace an estimated 111 million tons of discarded plastic by 2030.

Impact on plastic recycling 
One of the main reasons that China implemented the 2017 National Sword Policy was to decrease the importation of low quality plastics that are hard to sort and recycle and were accumulating in trash dumps and at recyclers. Before the ban, 95% of plastics collected in the European Union and 70 percent of plastics collected in the U.S. were sent to China. Most of these plastics were low quality, because of single stream collection and increased complexity of separating different colors and types of plastic.

Upon implementation of the policy in 2017, plastic imports to China plummeted by 99%. This led to waste stream backlogs across Europe and North America. When they could find buyers, most European plastic was diverted to  Indonesia, Turkey, India, Malaysia, and Vietnam.

See also 

 Operation Green Fence
 China waste import ban

References 

Environmental issues in China
Pollution in China